Leucaena greggii is a species of plant in the family Fabaceae. It is found only in Mexico. It is threatened by habitat loss. The species name greggii honors Josiah Gregg (1806 – 1850), a merchant, explorer, naturalist, and author of the American Southwest and Northern Mexico.

References

greggii
Flora of Mexico
Vulnerable plants
Taxonomy articles created by Polbot